A lovespoon is a wooden spoon decoratively carved that was traditionally presented as a gift of romantic intent. The spoon is normally decorated with symbols of love, and was intended to reflect the skill of the carver. Due to the intricate designs, lovespoons are no longer used as functioning spoons and are now decorative craft items.

Origins
The lovespoon is a traditional craft that dates back to the seventeenth century. Over generations, decorative carvings were added to the spoon and it lost its original practical use and became a treasured decorative item to be hung on a wall.

The earliest known dated lovespoon  from Wales, displayed in the St Fagans National History Museum near Cardiff, is from 1667, although the tradition is believed to date back long before that. The earliest dated lovespoon worldwide originates from Germany, and is dated as 1664.

Symbols
The lovespoon was given to a young woman by her suitor. It was important for the girl's father to see that the young man was capable of providing for the family and woodworking.

Sailors would often carve lovespoons during their long journeys, which is why anchors would often be incorporated into the carvings.

Certain symbols came to have specific meanings: a horseshoe for luck, a cross for faith, bells for marriage, hearts for love, a wheel supporting a loved one and a lock for security, among others. Caged balls indicated the number of children hoped for. Other difficult carvings, such as chains, were as much a demonstration of the carver's skill as a symbolic meaning.

Although the Welsh lovespoon is the most famous there are also traditions of lovespoons in Scandinavia and some parts of Eastern Europe, which have their own unique styles and techniques when it comes to the Lovespoon.

Today lovespoons are given as wedding and anniversary gifts, as well as birthday, baby gifts, Christmas or Valentine's Day gifts. They are now mostly seen as a folk craft.

Wedding spoons 

In old times, newly married couples in Norway ate with linked spoons to symbolize the linkage of their marriage. Often the spoons and chain were made from a single piece of wood, emphasizing wood-carving craftsmanship.

Similar linked spoons can be found in some ethnographic museums.

A design for making linked spoons was published in Popular Science in 1967.

See also 
 Wooden spoon
 Treen
 Loving cup

References

Further reading 
 H.E.Roese (2017). Welsh Love Spoon Controversy. https://sites.google.com/site/welshlovespooncontroversy
 

 
 
 

Arts in Wales
Spoons
Love